Two ships of the Royal Navy have been named HMS Tamarisk :

  an  sloop launched in 1916 and sold in 1922
 , a  launched in 1941, served in the Greek Navy as Tombazis between 1943 and 1952 and scrapped on return

Royal Navy ship names